Portunatasaurus ("Dugi Otok lizard") is a genus of mosasauroid squamate that lived during the Late Cretaceous period in what is now Croatia. It contains a single species, P. krambergeri, recovered from the Adriatic-Dinaric Carbonate Platform.

References

Mosasaurs
Late Cretaceous reptiles of Europe
Fossil taxa described in 2019